St. Andrew's Episcopal Church is a historic church on East Main Street in Yaphank, New York.

The church was built on land formerly owned by James Huggins Weeks, who was a Yaphank resident since 1827, and a former President of the Long Island Rail Road between 1847 and 1850. It was built in 1853 and was built to resemble The Old Grace Church in Massapequa. An extension on the east side of the church was added later on, but otherwise, it remains largely unchanged. The church was added to the National Register of Historic Places in 1988.

References

External links

Saint Andrews Episcopal Church and Cemetery (Longwood's Journey)
St. Andrew's Episcopal Church (Yaphank.org)

Episcopal church buildings in New York (state)
Churches on the National Register of Historic Places in New York (state)
Carpenter Gothic church buildings in New York (state)
Churches completed in 1853
19th-century Episcopal church buildings
Churches in Suffolk County, New York
National Register of Historic Places in Suffolk County, New York
1853 establishments in New York (state)